Metzgar Nunatak is a nunatak rising to about   south of Tollefson Nunatak in the Yee Nunataks, Palmer Land, Antarctica. It was mapped by the United States Geological Survey (USGS) from surveys and U.S. Navy aerial photographs, 1961–68, and from Landsat imagery taken 1973–74. It was named in 1987 by the Advisory Committee on Antarctic Names after USGS cartographer John M. Metzgar, Jr., a member of the USGS satellite surveying team at South Pole Station, winter party 1978.

References

Nunataks of Palmer Land